"Inspector Norse" is the debut single by Norwegian DJ and music producer Todd Terje, released on 19 June 2012 from his fourth extended play It's the Arps. The song was later featured as the twelfth and final track on his debut studio album It's Album Time. The official music video for the song was uploaded on 19 June 2012 to Pitchfork's YouTube channel. The song was named Mixmags top tune of 2012 and Resident Advisors second-best track of 2012.

Music video
The official music video for the song, lasting four minutes and twenty seconds, was uploaded on 19 June 2012 to the official Pitchfork YouTube channel. The video, which is an excerpt from the short film Whateverest, is centered on a Norwegian man named Marius Solem Johansen, known by his internet alias "Inspector Norse", and his passion for music, drugs and dancing.

Track listing

Charts

Release history

References

2012 songs
2012 debut singles
Todd Terje songs